Kelakam may refer to:
 Kelakam, India
 Kelakam, Niger